Gradimir Čanevski (born 4 March 1988) is a Macedonian handball player who plays for RK Butel Skopje.

References

1988 births
Living people
Macedonian male handball players
Sportspeople from Skopje